G. orientalis  may refer to:
 Garra orientalis, a ray-finned fish species
 Gnophomyia orientalis, a crane fly species in the genus Gnophomyia
 Goliathus orientalis, a Goliath beetle species found in Africa's tropical forests
 Gymnosoma orientalis, a tachinid fly species

Synonyms
 Glottula orientalis, a synonym for Polytela cliens, a moth species found through North Africa and the Sahara to Israel, Jordan, the Arabian Peninsula and to southern Iran
 Grammodes orientalis, a synonym for Grammodes geometrica, a moth species found from the Mediterranean east to Oriental and Australasian tropics
 Grewia orientalis, a synonym for Grewia oxyphylla, a plant species

See also
 Orientalis (disambiguation)